Proteuxoa sanguinipuncta is a moth of the family Noctuidae. It is found in Queensland, New South Wales, Victoria, Tasmania, South Australia, and south Western Australia. It is also present in New Zealand where it was first recorded in 2007.

Taxonomy 
This species was first described by Achille Guenée in 1852 and named Amphipyra sanguinipuncta.

Description 
The wingspan is about 40 mm. This species is distinctive as its forewings are covered with crimson spots and is unlikely to be confused with any other species in New Zealand.

Distribution 

This species is Australian but has been recorded in New Zealand since February 2007. Since first being recorded in 2007, this species has become common in the North Island in grassland habitat and has recently been recorded at the top of the South Island.

Behaviour 
In New Zealand this species is on the wing from February to April.

Host species 
The larvae feed on various grasses.

References

sanguinipuncta
Moths of Australia
Moths described in 1852
Moths of New Zealand